Homer Ferguson may refer to:

 Homer S. Ferguson (1889–1982), United States Senator from Michigan
 Homer L. Ferguson (1873–1953), American author and businessman